Aurelio Valle is an American singer, guitarist, composer and visual art residing in New York City born in Chicago, Illinois and raised in Kingsville, Texas. He is a founding member of the experimental rock group CALLA from New York City/Brooklyn, New York and is best known for his work with that group. The band was formed in New York City in 1997 along with Wayne Magruder and Sean Donovan, later adding member Peter Gannon.

He has provided scores to the German films Egoshooter and Tender Parasites, as well as the US short "Vamonos".

Texas
Valle was raised in South Texas and grew up listening to his Mexican parents' music, which included mariachi, conjuntos and rancheros. During his teen years in the 80's Valle listened to college music and punk rock. Drawing from these musical styles his guitar
influences are inspired by the likes of Rowland S. Howard, Duane Eddy, Kid Congo Powers, Chet Atkins, Lee Ronaldo, Will Sergeant, and Johnny Marr. He met Peter Gannon during his second year in high school. Both citing bands like The Jesus and Mary Chain and The Smiths as influences, they decided to form a band. After high school, they relocated to Denton, Texas where the two met Wayne Magruder and immediately formed a band called The Factory Press named after Andy Warhol's Factory and Factory Records Their influences were Joy Division, Bauhaus and Wire and they were signed to Austin's ND Records.

New York City
The Factory Press relocated to New York City and recorded their only full-length album The Smoky Ends of a Burnt Out Day before splitting in 1997. The album was produced by Matt Verta-Ray (Madder Rose, Speedball Baby) and Kid Congo Powers (The Gunclub, The Cramps and
Nick Cave and the Bad Seeds). After recording their final record for ND Records, Valle and Magruder along with Sean Donovan formed CALLA in 1997 named after the lilies in Robert Mapplethorpe's photographs. One of the bands concepts was to write music that sounded
like Ennio Morricone meets Blade Runner. CALLA continued to draw from their early influences in addition to Tom Waits, John Cage, Angelo Badalamenti/Julee Cruise, Talk Talk and Latin Playboys. CALLA's first self-titled record was released by the European experimental label Sub Rosa.

Sub Rosa/Quartermass
By 1997, CALLA was playing shows at The Cooler located on West 14th Street in New York City alongside Alan Vega, Thurston Moore, Blonde Redhead, Bowery Electric, Labradford, reunited Bush Tetras, and were invited to play a benefit for Silver Apples' Simeon Coxe. They also played CBGB's in 1998 with Speedball Baby. By this time the band had already toured heavily in Europe and was ready to set off on its first US tour.

Young God records
CALLA frequently played shows at Tonic where they eventually met Michael Gira of Swans and The Angels of Light. Gira signed CALLA to his label, Young God Records, in 1999, for which they recorded their second record titled Scavengers . Gira assisted in producing and sang backing vocals on the track "Love of Ivah". During this time the band continued to tour heavily in Europe. In 2000 they were selected by Alternative Press Magazine as "the number one band to watch" out of 50 peers and New York City bands. When playing in NYC, CALLA often billed alongside their friends Interpol, The Walkmen, The Angels of Light, Godspeed You! Black Emperor, Luna and The Secret Machines.

Arena Rock Recording Company
With the momentum from the release of Scavengers, the band signed with Williamsburg, Brooklyn-based indie label Arena Rock Recording Company. In 2002, the band went into the studio with producer Chris Zane to record their third record Televised. The album was released in 2003
and was supported by extensive US and European tours. Their first videos were made by Moh Azima and Greg Brunkalla for the songs "Televise" and "Strangler" respectively and were played on MTV and MTV2.

Beggars Group
CALLA's fourth album Collisions was recorded after the departure of member Donovan and addition of The Factory Press member Peter Gannon. The album was recorded independently with producer Chris Zane with additional production by Victor Van Vugt (Nick Cave and the Bad Seeds, PJ Harvey). They were signed to Beggars Group after the record was completed. In 2006, CALLA continued playing shows throughout Europe including Greece, Spain, Italy and a final headlining spot in Moscow.

During the band's US tour in support of Collisions, they were arrested at the Canada–US border for allegedly driving a stolen van. They were handcuffed and brought to the police station and then later released after it
was discovered that the license plate registered as stolen due to a clerical error. 

The band wrote and recorded tracks for its fifth record Strength in Numbers while on the road for Collisions. They put the final touches on the record with producer Alex Lyon at The Bubble in Austin, Texas.

CALLA continued to tour with Interpol in 2007 until the band decided it was time to take a hiatus. The band continues to work on projects together; the next CALLA record or project has been unannounced to this date. 
Valle, a long time photographer and artist, contributed his work along with Wayne Magruder on several CALLA album covers.

In 2004, Valle contributed work for the CANADA Gallery show "I throw Herring to the dog" curated by Marcela Mullins.

In 2005, four of his pieces were featured in a show at Gigantic Gallery. All four pieces were sold and the proceeds were donated to the Red Cross for disaster relief after Hurricane Katrina.

He also contributed artwork for Fuse Gallery's show in 2008 titled "DRAW" curated by Erik Foss and Curse Mackey. His work was shown alongside other artists such as Gibby Haynes, Mark Gonzales, H.R. Geiger and many more.
 
In 2009, Valle along with Pedro Mena and Julian Duff curated a show of 24 NYC artists in Johnson City, New York called "Set in Concrete." The show featured artwork by Lee Ronaldo, Nick Zinner, Lizzi Bugatsos and several other New York City artists.

Film
Valle scored the 2004 feature film Egoshooter directed by Oliver Schwabe and Christian Becker, produced by Wim Wenders.

In 2005, CALLA scored the feature film Satellite for Jeff Winner produced Gigantic Pictures.

The CALLA song "Astral" was featured in the 2004 film The Manchurian Candidate directed by Johathan Demme.

In 2007, The CALLA song "Swagger" was featured in the feature film Weirdsville directed by Alan Moyle.

Valle scored the short film "Vamonos", directed by Maurice Compte which aired on Showtime.

In 2009, the CALLA song "Fear of Fireflies" was featured in the documentary "Fireflies" directed by Gili Meisler. That same year, Valle scored the German feature film Zarte Parasiten directed by Oliver Schwabe and Christian Becker. In 2011, the original score for "Zarte Parasiten" received a nomination for the German Film Academy Award (Deutscher Filmpreis).

Solo work
Valle co-wrote and contributed vocals to the Phenomenal Handclap Band's 2009 song "Testimony" along with Jaleel Bunton of TV on the Radio.

In, 2009 Aurelio Valle wrote the song "Electraglide" for Nina Persson (The Cardigans, A Camp), featured in the film Zarte Parasiten. He also recorded a cover of the Yello song "Lost Again" for the same project.

Valle released his debut solo album Acme Power Transmission on May 30, 2014, which was recorded in his apartment in 2013. Aurelio Valle is currently working on scoring for commercials and film.

References

Living people
American rock musicians
American musicians of Mexican descent
Year of birth missing (living people)